Buell Arthur Nesbett (sometimes spelled Nesbitt) (June 2, 1910 in New Mexico – August 17, 1993 in Anchorage, Alaska) was an American soldier, lawyer, businessman, and the first chief justice of the Alaska Supreme Court.

Born in New Mexico, Nesbett earned his law degree at the University of San Francisco in 1940 and served with distinction in the Navy during World War II, commanding the USS Atlas and earning a Bronze Star.

He settled in Anchorage, Alaska after the war and practiced law until his appointment in 1959 to be the first chief justice of the newly created Alaska Supreme Court. Given three years to set up the new state's courts, he accomplished the job in 6 months. He served on the court until 1970, when an airplane accident led him to resign for reasons of health.

Nesbett was also involved with an effort to reopen an Alaskan coal mine; he was president of the Buffalo Coal Mining Company and suffered financial losses when the company was unable to successfully reopen the mine.

Nesbett married Enid Elsie "Barbara" Allen, an English nurse whom he met in England during the war; he left 6 children, 2 sons and 4 daughters, at the time of his death.

The state courthouse in Anchorage is named in his honor.

References

1910 births
1993 deaths
Justices of the Alaska Supreme Court
United States Navy personnel of World War II
Lawyers from Anchorage, Alaska
University of San Francisco School of Law alumni
20th-century American judges
Businesspeople from Anchorage, Alaska
Military personnel from Anchorage, Alaska
Chief Justices of the Alaska Supreme Court
20th-century American businesspeople
20th-century American lawyers
United States Navy officers